Elis is a constituency in West Greece represented in the Hellenic Parliament. It elects five Members of Parliament (MPs) by the reinforced proportional representation system of election. It comprises the Elis regional unit.

Election results

Legislative election

Members of Parliament

Current members
Gerasimos Balaouras SYRIZA
Dimitris Baxevanakis SYRIZA
Efi Georgopoulou-Saltari SYRIZA
Konstantinos Tzavaras  ND
Giannis Koutsoukos PASOK

Members (Jan 2015–Sep 2015)
Since election of January 2015 Elis elected five members of parliament
Gerasimos Balaouras SYRIZA
Dimitris Baxevanakis SYRIZA
Efi Georgopolou-Saltari SYRIZA
Konstantinos Tzavaras  ND
Giannis Koutsoukos PASOK

Members of Parliament (2012–2015)
In Election 2012 Elis elected six members of parliament
Konstantinos Tzavaras ND
Dionysia - Theodora Avgerinopoulou ND
Georgios Kontogiannis ND
Andreas Marinos ND
Efstathia Georgopoulou - Saltari SYRIZA
Giannis Koutsoukos PASOK

Notes and references

Parliamentary constituencies of Greece
Elis